José Luis Gómez Hurtado (born 17 August 1990), commonly known as Joselu, is a Spanish footballer who plays mainly as a right winger.

Club career
Born in Granada, Andalusia, Joselu started playing as a senior with local Granada CF in the third division, after finishing his youth career with FC Barcelona. In the summer of 2010 he joined another Catalonia side, Tercera División's RCD Espanyol B.

After one season, Joselu rescinded his contract with the club and signed for Real Jaén of the third division. For the 2012–13 campaign he continued in that level and his native region, with UD Almería's reserves.

Joselu made his competitive debut with Almería's first team on 17 August 2012, playing the last two minutes of the 5–4 away win against FC Barcelona B in what was his maiden Segunda División appearance. On 2 July of the following year, he moved to neighbouring Córdoba CF in the same tier.

References

External links

La Segunda B profile 

1990 births
Living people
Footballers from Granada
Spanish footballers
Association football wingers
Segunda División players
Segunda División B players
Tercera División players
FC Barcelona Atlètic players
Granada CF footballers
RCD Espanyol B footballers
Real Jaén footballers
UD Almería B players
UD Almería players
Córdoba CF players
Lorca FC players
Linares Deportivo footballers